José Fajardo Nelson (born 18 August 1993) is a Panamanian footballer who plays as a forward for Cusco FC and the Panama national team.

Club career
Fajardo began his career with promoted side Independiente in the Liga Panameña de Fútbol during the 2017–18 season. Fajardo finished as top scorer of the 2018 Clausura, leading Independiente to their first ever national league title.

International career
Fajardo made his international debut for Panama on 25 October 2017 in a 5–0 friendly away win against Grenada. On 14 May 2018, Fajardo was included in Panama's preliminary squad for the 2018 FIFA World Cup. However, he did not make the final 23.

International goals
Scores and results list Panama's goal tally first.

Honours

Independiente
 Liga Panameña de Fútbol: 2018 Clausura

References

External links
 

1993 births
Living people
Sportspeople from Colón, Panama
Panamanian footballers
Panama international footballers
Panamanian expatriate footballers
Association football forwards
Al-Kawkab FC players
C.A. Independiente de La Chorrera players
Liga Panameña de Fútbol players
Saudi First Division League players
Expatriate footballers in Saudi Arabia
Expatriate footballers in Ecuador
Panamanian expatriate sportspeople in Saudi Arabia
2019 CONCACAF Gold Cup players
2021 CONCACAF Gold Cup players